The 2013 Open Harmonie mutuelle was a professional tennis tournament played on hard courts. It was the tenth edition of the tournament which was part of the 2013 ATP Challenger Tour. It took place in Saint-Brieuc, France between 1 and 7 April 2013.

Singles main-draw entrants

Seeds

 1 Rankings are as of March 18, 2013.

Other entrants
The following players received wildcards into the singles main draw:
  Romain Jouan
  Constant Lestienne
  Fabrice Martin
  Mathieu Rodrigues

The following players received entry from the qualifying draw:
  Adrien Bossel
  Martin Fischer
  Hugo Nys
  Danilo Petrović

Doubles main-draw entrants

Seeds

1 Rankings as of March 18, 2013.

Other entrants
The following pairs received wildcards into the doubles main draw:
  Arnaud Grard /  Glenn Le Flochmoen

Champions

Singles

 Jesse Huta Galung def.  Kenny de Schepper, 7–6 (7–4), 4–6, 7–6 (7–3)

Doubles

 Tomasz Bednarek /  Andreas Siljeström def.  Jesse Huta Galung /  Konstantin Kravchuk, 6–3, 4–6, [10–7]

External links
Official Website

Open Harmonie mutuelle
Saint-Brieuc Challenger
2013 in French tennis
April 2013 sports events in France